
Gmina Bychawa is an urban-rural gmina (administrative district) in Lublin County, Lublin Voivodeship, in eastern Poland.

4,893, and the population of the rural part of the gmina is 6,754.

Villages
Apart from the town of Bychawa, Gmina Bychawa contains the villages and settlements of Bychawka Druga, Bychawka Druga-Kolonia, Bychawka Pierwsza, Bychawka Trzecia, Bychawka Trzecia-Kolonia, Gałęzów, Gałęzów-Kolonia Druga, Gałęzów-Kolonia Pierwsza, Grodzany, Józwów, Kosarzew Dolny-Kolonia, Kowersk, Łęczyca, Leśniczówka, Marysin, Olszowiec, Olszowiec-Kolonia, Osowa, Osowa-Kolonia, Podzamcze, Romanów, Skawinek, Stara Wieś Druga, Stara Wieś Pierwsza, Stara Wieś Trzecia, Urszulin, Wandzin, Wincentówek, Wola Duża, Wola Duża-Kolonia, Wola Gałęzowska, Wola Gałęzowska-Kolonia, Zadębie, Zaraszów, Zaraszów-Kolonia and Zdrapy.

Neighbouring gminas
Gmina Bychawa is bordered by the gminas of Jabłonna, Krzczonów, Strzyżewice, Wysokie, Zakrzew and Zakrzówek.

References

Bychawa
Lublin County